Kab 101 is a Sea Pony-type minimum-facilities light-production oil platform operated by Mexican state-owned oil company PEMEX, and installed about  off the coast of Tabasco, near the port of , in 1994. The platform was designed by British engineering firm SLP Engineering Limited.  The platform also produces the wells Kab 103 and Kab 121. This platform was the site of the accident which eventually led to the death of 22 workers. Pemex would contract two independent studies and one by itself and in an exercise of transparency, posted the reports on its website.  On October 31, 2008, PEMEX released the result of the independent studies of the accident.

Usumacinta accident timeline
October 21, 2007: The jackup rig Usumacinta is moved to the location of Kab 101 to prepare for work on the well Kab 103.

October 23, 2007, 0700: The arrival of Cold Front No. 4 with winds exceeding  causes all personnel on the rig to cease operations.

08:00 – 11:00: The Usumacinta begins moving with the  seas, because its ballast and anchor points have not been properly set.

11:30: The Usumacinta's auxiliary cover below its cantilever collides with the wellhead Kab 121, which begins leaking oil and gas.

11:40 – 13:55: The crew of the Usumacinta attempts to close the sub-surface storm valves for both Kab 101 and the leaking Kab 121, to prevent further danger to the people on board the platform.  This is only temporarily successful at stopping the leak from Kab 121.

15:30: The storm valves on Kab 121 fail and hydrogen sulfide is detected, prompting the order to evacuate the platform.

15:45: All 73 people from the platform were accounted for in the two lifeboats, and were wearing life jackets.

Lifeboat #1
Around 16:13 the lifeboat began to fill with water.  This eventually led to the lifeboat crew becoming panicked and attempting to leave the lifeboat, in an attempt to board the M/V Morrison Tide. The lifeboat eventually capsized around 17:28, and a collision between the two lifeboats left most of Lifeboat #1's occupants drifting in the water. Two crew members from the Morrison Tide were lost in rescue operations; one died from injuries and another was lost at sea. Some survivors were also rescued by the M/V Isla Del Torro.

The lifeboat eventually drifted ashore east of Nuevo Campechito with nobody on board.

Lifeboat #2
This lifeboat started out with poor visibility due to the oil from the leaking well Kab 121.  The hatches were opened so the helmsman could see, and to allow for ventilation due to several people complaining of dizziness inside. At 17:42 the lifeboat was struck by a huge wave, and overturned. 33 to 35 people were trapped and had to fight to escape the boat.

The next day Lifeboat #2 reached the shore west of Nuevo Progreso upside down, with 12 survivors on top, and one survivor and four bodies inside.

Well control and aftermath
In December 2007 Pemex estimated that  of leaked oil were recovered with another  remaining in the environment.

On November 13, during attempts to control the leaks resulting from the accident, the well Kab 121 ignited and was brought under control the same day.  On the 20th of November, Kab 121 ignited again, this time the fire destroyed the remains of the Derrick and was controlled on December 3.

Scrappers
On August 4, 2008, another fire was extinguished on the Usumacinta.  This fire is suspected to have been caused by scrappers attempting to steal from the abandoned rig. This blaze was extinguished by the ships “Isla Guadalupe”, “Isla Cozumel”, “Pionero”, “Conquistador”, and "Deep Endeavour". The Mexican Navy also sent the interceptor "Auriga" to the area at the request of PEMEX.

Notes

External links
 Complete Battelle Report of the Accident 
 Official Pemex photos 
 Usumacinta accident article
 MEXICO: Oil Rig Accident Kills 18 Early ABC News article.
 Pemex Probes Usumacinta Accident Rigzone article.

Oil platforms
Pemex
Oil platform disasters
Oil spills in Mexico
2007 industrial disasters
2007 in Mexico
Gulf Coast of Mexico
1994 establishments in Mexico